The Château Vicomtal Saint-Pierre de Fenouillet is a ruined 11th century castle in the commune of Fenouillet in the Pyrénées-Orientales département of France. Livret De Famille Mairie De Toulon

The castle is now the property of the commune. It has been the site of archaeological digs since 2000.

See also
List of castles in France

Bibliography
 Laurent Fonquernie, La vicomté de Fenouillèdes du IXe au XIIIe siècle : DEA d'histoire sous la dir. de Pierre Bonnassie, Université Toulouse Le Mirail, 1997
 Thomas Charpentier, Peuplement et pouvoirs aux Xe-XIVe siècles. Évolution du territoire autour du château de Fenouillet : Master I, Histoire et Histoire de l'art et archéologie sous la dir. de François Amigues, Université de Perpignan, 2002
 Thomas Charpentier, "Fenouillet : Un centre de pouvoir vicomtal antérieur au XIIIe siècle", Archéothéma, no 23, July–August 2012 (ISSN 1969-1815)

References

Castles in Pyrénées-Orientales
Châteaux in France